Alice Coulthard (born 18 November 1983 in London) is an English actress. She is best known for her role as Maisie Wylde in ITV soap opera Emmerdale.

Education
Alice Coulthard attended Fortismere School, Muswell Hill, N10 and later graduated in English Literature from University of Liverpool.

Career
Coulthard has played a number of roles on British television, including The Bill, Holby City, Sex, the City and Me, and the lead role in drama short Goodbye, Hello. Coulthard also starred in 1993 film The Cement Garden, and the stageplay Keeler in the title role of Christine Keeler.  More recently she has played Kelly Tophet in hit US TV series The Last Ship and the title role in independent film Josephine.

She played Maisie Wylde, introduced to the ITV1 soap opera Emmerdale by series producer Anita Turner, from February 2009 to January 2011.

She was a voice and motion capture actress for Virtual reality game's Lone Echo main character Cpt. Olivia Rhodes

Personal life
Coulthard married Owen Dyke, bassplayer of White Rose Movement on 1 August 2010.

Awards and nominations

References

External links

1983 births
Living people
Actresses from London
Alumni of the University of Liverpool
English child actresses
English television actresses
English soap opera actresses